West Kennebago Mountain is a mountain located in Oxford County, Maine. West Kennebago is flanked to the north by Twin Mountains, and to the southwest by Burnt Mountain.

West Kennebago Mountain stands within the watershed of the upper Androscoggin River, which drains into Merrymeeting Bay, the estuary of the Kennebec River, and then into the Gulf of Maine. The east side of West Kennebago Mountain drains into the Kennebago River, then into Cupsuptic Lake, through a series of lakes into the Rapid River and Umbagog Lake, the source of the Androscoggin River. The north end of West Kennebago drains into Otter Brook, then into the Kennebago River. The west side of the mountain drains into the Little East Branch of the Cupsuptic River, then into Cupsuptic Lake. The south end of West Kennebago drains into Beaver Brook, then into the Cupsuptic River.

References 

Mountains of Oxford County, Maine
Mountains of Maine